Thomas Arthur 'Tony' Torrance (13 March 1891 – 8 December 1976) was a Scottish amateur golfer who played in the early 20th century. He played in five Walker Cup matches between 1924 and 1934.

Early life
Torrance was born in Edinburgh in 1891. His older brother, William Breck, was also a noted amateur golfer.

Golf career
Torrance played in five Walker Cup matches, 1924, 1928, 1930, 1932, 1934. He was the captain in 1932.

Torrance was joint runner-up in the 1927 German Open at Wannsee Berlin G&CC behind Percy Alliss. He was twice winner of the Worplesdon Mixed Foursomes, in 1921 when he was partnered with Eleanor Helme, and in 1934, when playing with Molly Gourlay.

Death
Torrance died in Sandwich, Kent on 8 December 1976.

Amateur wins
this list is incomplete
1925 Irish Amateur Open Championship
1926 Golf Illustrated Gold Vase (tie with Cyril Tolley)
1927 German Amateur
1929 German Amateur

Team appearances
Walker Cup (representing Great Britain): 1924, 1928, 1930, 1932 (playing captain), 1934
England–Scotland Amateur Match (representing Scotland): 1922 (winners), 1923 (winners), 1925, 1926, 1928, 1929 (tie), 1930

References

Scottish male golfers
Amateur golfers
Golfers from Edinburgh
1891 births
1976 deaths